Par avion is a French term meaning "by air" often used on airmail etiquettes

Par Avion may also refer to: 

Par Avion, Australian airline a.k.a. Airlines of Tasmania
Par Avion (Lost), TV series episode
Par Avion (band), a band from the United States
Par Avion (EP), a 2009 EP by High Flight Society
"Par Avion", song by Mike + the Mechanics from Mike + The Mechanics (1985 album)
"Par Avion", song by FM Belfast from their 2008 album How to Make Friends